Eutelia furcata, the Florida eutelia moth, is a moth of the family Noctuidae. The species was first described by Francis Walker in 1865. It is found from the southern United States (including Arizona, Texas and Florida) to Mexico, Cuba, Puerto Rico and Central America.

The wingspan is about 30 mm.

References

Euteliinae
Moths of North America
Moths of the Caribbean
Moths of Central America
Moths of Cuba
Moths of Guadeloupe
Lepidoptera of Jamaica
Insects of Puerto Rico
Moths described in 1865